Meegan Warner (born August 5, 1991) is an Australian actress. She is known for her portrayal of Mary Woodhull in the AMC series Turn: Washington's Spies and as young Lady Rapunzel Tremaine in Once Upon a Time.

Filmography

Television

References

External links
 

21st-century Australian actresses
1991 births
Living people